Chandol is a village located in Buldhana Tehsil of Buldhana district in Maharashtra, India.

According to Census 2011 information the location code or village code of Chandol village is 529325. Chandol village is located in Buldana tehsil of Buldana district in Maharashtra, India. It is situated 35 km away from sub-district headquarter Buldana (tehsildar office) and 35 km away from district headquarter Buldana. As per 2009 stats, Chandol is the gram panchayat of Chandol village.

The total geographical area of village is 2404.97 hectares. Chandol has a total population of 8,645 peoples, out of which male population is 4,411 while female population is 4,234. Literacy rate of chandol village is 64.64% out of which 73.00% males and 55.93% females are literate. There are about 1,699 houses in chandol village. Pincode of chandol village locality is 443106.

When it comes to administration, Chandol village is administrated by a sarpanch who is elected representative of the village by the local elections. As per 2019 stats, Chandol village comes under Chikhli assembly constituency & Buldhana parliamentary constituency. Buldana is nearest town to chandol for all major economic activities, which is approximately 35 km away.

Education 
1) SHRI SHIVAJI HIGH SCH CHANDOL

Established in year 1971, SHRI SHIVAJI HIGH SCH CHANDOL is located in Rural area of Maharashtra state/ut of India. In Chandol area of Buldana block of Buldana district. Area pincode is 443106.

School is providing Upper Primary, Secondary, High Secondary (6-12) level education and is being managed by Private Aided Organisation.

2)SHARAD PAWAR URDU HIGH & JR COLLEGE CHANDOL

Established in year 2006, SHARAD PAWAR URDU HIGH & JR COLLEGE CHANDOL is located in Rural area of Maharashtra state/ut of India. In Chandol area of Buldana block of Buldana district. Area pincode is 443106.

School is providing Secondary, High Secondary (9-12) level education and is being managed by Private Unaided Organisation.

Medium of instruction is Urdu language and school is Co-educational.

School is affiliated with State Board for both secondary and high secondary level.

Banks 
GOVERNMENT BANK

1) Bank of Maharashtra, Chandol

The CHANDOL branch of BANK OF MAHARASHTRA is located in the BULDHANA district of the MAHARASHTRA State at Dhanvat Bhavan, Chandol, Taluka Dhad Dist ? Buldana 443000. The IFSC Code of the branch is MAHB0000755 and its MICR Code is MICR not provided.

The working hours of the CHANDOL branch of BANK OF MAHARASHTRA are Monday to Saturday from 10am to 4pm while the 2nd and the 4th Saturdays generally remain non-working days. One may call the designated branch office too at its phone number 18002334526..

PRAVITE BANK

1) Buldhana Urban Bank, Chandol

2) Chikhali Urban Bank, Chandol

External links 
1. https://m.timesofindia.com/city/nashik/13-injured-as-private-bus-overturns-in-trimbakeshwar/articleshow/96874406.cms

2. https://www.financialexpress.com/chandol-b-o-pincode-443106-83424/

References 

Villages in Buldhana district